Noodang Pimpol ; 15 October 1968 – 11 January 2011) is a Thai sprinter. She competed in the women's 400 metres at the 1992 Summer Olympics.

References

1968 births
2011 deaths
Athletes (track and field) at the 1992 Summer Olympics
Noodang Pimpol
Noodang Pimpol
Place of birth missing (living people)
Asian Games medalists in athletics (track and field)
Noodang Pimpol
Athletes (track and field) at the 1994 Asian Games
Medalists at the 1994 Asian Games
Olympic female sprinters
Noodang Pimpol
Noodang Pimpol
Southeast Asian Games medalists in athletics
Noodang Pimpol